Victor "Kakoy" Legaspi (sometimes spelled Kakoi) is a  Filipino musician, best known for being a part of the second evolution of the Rivermaya lineup wherein he served as guitarist from 2001 until 2004 and co-writing the band's hit song "Balisong". He was with Rivermaya in two studio albums, one extended play, and one live album.

Legaspi also played for Barbie's Cradle and Peryodiko, and as a session guitarist for Bamboo Mañalac and Dong Abay.

See also 
 Rivermaya
 Barbie's Cradle
 Bullet Dumas

References 

Filipino rock guitarists
Rivermaya members